Kassapa II was the King of Anuradhapura in the 7th century, whose reign lasted from 650 to 659. He succeeded Dathopa Tissa I as King of Anuradhapura and was succeeded by Dappula I.

See also
 List of Sri Lankan monarchs
 History of Sri Lanka

References

External links
 Kings & Rulers of Sri Lanka
 Codrington's Short History of Ceylon

Monarchs of Anuradhapura
K
K
K